KKKJ (105.5 FM, "3KJ Jammin 105.5") is a radio station broadcasting a Rhythmic Contemporary Hit Radio music format. Licensed to Merrill, Oregon, United States, the station is currently owned by Wynne Broadcasting Company, Inc. through its licensee Cove Road Publishing, LLC.

References

External links

KKJ
Rhythmic contemporary radio stations in the United States
Klamath County, Oregon
Radio stations established in 2008
2008 establishments in Oregon